Holy Mother of God Cathedral, or Surp Asdvadzadzin Church, is the Armenian Apostolic cathedral of the Armenian Diocese of Cyprus, located in the Strovolos district in Nicosia, Cyprus.

Following the 1963-1964 inter-communal troubles, the Armenian-Cypriot community of Nicosia lost its mediaeval church Notre Dame de Tyre now located in North Nicosia. As a result, President Makarios granted them use of the old Ayios Dhometios chapel in Ayios Dhometios.

With the help of the World Council of Churches, the Church of Westphalia, the Cyprus government and the faithful, a new church was built in Strovolos, also called "Sourp Asdvadzadzin". Its foundation stone was laid on 25 September 1976 by Archbishop Makarios III and Archbishop Nerses Pakhdigian. It was officially inaugurated on 22 November 1981 by Catholicos of Cilicia Khoren I and Coadjutor Catholicos of Cilicia Karekin II, in the presence of Archbishop Chrysostomos I, Bishop Zareh Aznavorian and Representative Dr. Antranik L. Ashdjian.

It is the only church in Cyprus built in a traditional Armenian style, with a central octagonal dome and a smaller dome for the bell. The church was renovated in 2005 in memory of the Tutundjian family, killed in the Helios air accident, while the belfry was also repaired that year in memory of der Vazken Sandrouni. The church was renovated on the inside in 2008. Many of its icons are the work of Lebanese-Armenian painter Zohrab Keshishian.

In the same complex with this church is the Nareg Armenian School of Nicosia (1972), the Armenian Prelature building (1984), the Armenian genocide Monument (1992), the statue of Krikor Naregatsi (1991), a marble khachkar (2001) and Archbishop Zareh's bust (2005). Below the Prelature building is the "Vahram Utidjian" Hall (1998), venue for many cultural and other events of the community.

The current pastor of the Sourp Asdvadzadzin church is der Momig Habeshian.

See also 
Armenians in Cyprus

References 

 
 
hayem.org

Armenian diaspora in Cyprus
Armenian churches in Cyprus
Armenian Apostolic Church in Cyprus
Churches in Nicosia
Cathedrals in Cyprus